The common green magpie (Cissa chinensis) is a member of the crow family, roughly about the size of the Eurasian jay or slightly smaller. In the wild specimens are usually a bright green colour (often fades to turquoise in captivity or with poor diet as the pigment is carotenoid based), slightly lighter on the underside and has a thick black stripe from the bill (through the eyes) to the nape. Compared to the other members of its genus, the white-tipped tail is quite long. This all contrasts vividly with the red fleshy eye rims, bill and legs. The wings are reddish maroon.

It is found from the lower Himalayas in north eastern India in a broad south easterly band down into central Thailand, Malaysia, Sumatra and northwestern Borneo in evergreen forest (including bamboo forest), clearings and scrub.

This bird seeks food both on the ground and in trees, and takes a very high percentage of animal prey from countless invertebrates, small reptiles, mammals and young birds and eggs. It will also take flesh from a recently killed carcass.

The nest is built in trees, large shrubs and often in tangles of various climbing vines. There are usually 4–6 eggs laid.

The voice is quite varied but often a harsh peep-peep. It also frequently whistles and chatters.

Taxonomy

The common green magpie was described by the French polymath Georges-Louis Leclerc, Comte de Buffon in 1775 in his Histoire Naturelle des Oiseaux. The bird was also illustrated in a hand-coloured plate engraved by François-Nicolas Martinet in the Planches Enluminées D'Histoire Naturelle which was produced under the supervision of Edme-Louis Daubenton to accompany Buffon's text. Neither the plate caption nor Buffon's description included a scientific name but in 1783 the Dutch naturalist Pieter Boddaert coined the binomial name Coracias chinensis in his catalogue of the Planches Enluminées. Buffon believed that his specimen had come from China but the species only occurs in the extreme south of the country. The type locality was redesignated in 1952 by the German ornithologist Erwin Stresemann as Mergui, Tanintharyi Region, Myanmar.

The common green magpie is now one of four species that are placed in the genus Cissa that was introduced by the German zoologist Friedrich Boie in 1826 with the common green magpie as the type species. The generic name is from the Ancient Greek kissa meaning a "jay" or "magpie". The specific epithet chinensis was chosen by Boddaert in the mistaken belief that the specimen illustrated by Martinet had come from China.

Five subspecies are recognised:
  C. c. chinensis (Boddaert, 1783) – Himalayas to south China, north Indochina, Thailand and Myanmar
  C. c. klossi Delacour & Jabouille, 1924 – central Indochina
  C. c. margaritae Robinson & Kloss, 1919 – Lang Bian Mountains (south Vietnam)
  C. c. robinsoni Ogilvie-Grant, 1906 – Malay Peninsula
  C. c. minor Cabanis, 1850 – Sumatra and Borneo

References

common green magpie
Birds of Southeast Asia
Birds of Bhutan
Birds of China
Birds of Northeast India
Birds of Nepal
Birds of Yunnan
common green magpie
common green magpie